Saint Andrew is one of Dominica's 10 administrative parishes. It is bordered by St. John and St. Peter (to the west), St. Joseph (to the southwest), and St. David (to the southeast).

At 178.27 km² (68.83 mi²), it is the island's largest parish in area.  Its population is 10,461, which makes it the second most populated parish, after St. George.

Settlements
Marigot is its largest village, with 2,676 people. Other communities include:

Wesley
Woodford Hill
Calibishie
Hampstead
Bense
Dos D'Ane
Anse du Mé
Paix Bouche
Thibaud
Vieille Case (also known as Itassi)
Penville

Notable people
Well-known people born in the parish include famous schoolteacher Wills Strathmore Stevens (after whom a Marigot school is named), and Dominica's current prime minister, Roosevelt Skerrit (born in Vieille Case).

Transportation
Some of Dominica's most excellent roads can be found in much of St. Andrew's road system.

The parish also boasts Dominica's main airport (at Melville Hall Estate), which opened in 1961. It is now open to night landing.

In 1982, Anse du Mé was made a legal port; the government of Canada provided a floating jetty for the village.

Industry
A Fisheries Complex at Marigot Bay began operation in mid-2004.

References

External links

 
Parishes of Dominica